Yma o Hyd (English: "Still Here") is a Welsh language folk song by Dafydd Iwan. The song was released during Iwan and Ar Log's 'Taith Macsen' ("Macsen's Journey") tour in 1983. Since then it has continued to gain popularity at cultural and sporting events.

Background 

Iwan was described by Ned Thomas as "the master" of the popular songs that accompanied the growth of Welsh nationalism in the 1960s. These songs were often characterised by both satirical and political themes as well as historical references. Indeed, Iwan became a key figure in Welsh culture as a well known television personality, recording artist and an outspoken member of Welsh nationalist organisations. Iwan's early career has been described as playing a major role "in mobilising the Welsh popular music scene in a nationalist linguistic direction."

However, by the time Iwan wrote Yma o Hyd, his life and career was much more troubled, having been imprisoned four times for his activism and now in the middle of a "terrible divorce". Iwan was also "feeling demoralised" at recent political events such as the rejection of a new Welsh Assembly in a 1979 referendum, the government of Margaret Thatcher and UK economic policies that would soon lead to the 1984 Miners' Strike.

It was against this background that Iwan was looking to write a song that would "raise the spirits". During a conversation with his friend, the historian and Plaid Cymru MP Gwynfor Evans Iwan is said to have been given the initial idea for the song, which draws parallels between what he saw as the contemporary threats to Wales and the historical threats the nation had suffered and survived since the Roman era. As such, Iwan hoped the song would "remind people we still speak Welsh against all odds. To show we are still here".

Composition 

The song consists of three verses and a repeated chorus, with the opening and closing verses reference Macsen Wledig. Macsen is a prominent figure in Medieval Welsh literature, recorded in the sixth century by Gildas and in the ninth century work, Historia Brittonum where Macsen is said to have transferred authority back to British rulers. As such, Macsen is the common progenerator listed in the earliest Welsh genealogies and on the Pillar of Eliseg, erected by a Welsh king who was still claiming Macsen as an ancestor nearly 500 years after he left Britain. He was considered the founding father of several medieval Welsh dynasties, including those of the Kingdom of Powys and the Kingdom of Gwent, and he figures in lists of the Fifteen Tribes of Wales. In Welsh legend, Macsen appears in stories such as Breuddwyd Macsen Wledig (English: The Dream of Emperor Maximus) which features in the White Book of Rhydderch. 

In Yma o Hyd, Iwan uses the still common knowledge of Macsen to show that the memory and culture of the Ancient Britons is still here, with the Welsh language being a Brythonic language that the ancient Britons would have spoken.

The third verse references Macsen alongside the eighteenth century caricature Dic Siôn Dafydd and the contemporary figure of Margaret Thatcher. Iwan hoped to parallel the troubles of ancient Wales with the more modern threats to the nation, to demonstrate the fortitude and survival of the Welsh culture at a time he felt it was most threatened.

Cultural impact 
Iwan debuted the song on his 1983 tour with the folk band Ar Log. The "Macsen tour" (named for Yma o Hyd's references to Macsen Wledig) was a great success, with Iwan and Ar Log deciding to release a joint album of the new music later in the year.

As a response to Thatcherism 
During the 1984-85 miners' strike, Iwan would sing Yma o Hyd on the picket lines on numerous occasions, as well as performing it for quarry workers and farmers. Iwan stated that "the effects of Thatcherism were so blatant, so far-reaching. And Welshness was in turmoil. Yma o Hyd was a deliberate antidote to that."

It has been suggested that the song played a "not insignificant" role in raising the morale of Welsh nationalists during Margaret Thatcher's 1980s tenure as Prime Minister of the UK. The original version of the song refers to Thatcher, "Er gwaetha hen Fagi a'i chriw" ("Despite old Maggie and her crew”). Following Thatcher's ordered closure of Welsh mines, fewer than 40% of Welsh households were headed by someone in full-time employment by 1986 and "two-thirds of Welsh miners would become redundant".

Impact on education and language 
The song also inspired a resurgence of support for Welsh medium education and (amongst other factors) contributed to the delivery of the Education Reform Act of 1988. The song also contributed to support for the Welsh language, namely the Welsh Language Act 1993, which placed Welsh on equal footing with English in Wales for the first time in UK history.

Impact on devolution and nationalism 
The song contributed to support for a National Assembly for Wales (later renamed Senedd) and in 1998 the Welsh electorate voted in favour of Welsh devolution. In January 2020, the song reached number one in the UK iTunes chart, spurred on by purchases by supporters of Welsh independence group YesCymru. The campaign mirrored the success of the Wolfe Tones song "Come Out, Ye Black and Tans" earlier that month.

In sport 

Even before the release of Yma o Hyd, Iwan's music had a long association with Llanelli RFC. Most notably, Ray Gravell would sing Iwan's songs for his Llanelli, Wales and British and Irish Lions team mates. The song would became a more official team anthem in the 1990s when Gravell became president of the club and arranged for the song to be played everytime Llanelli and the Scarlets scored. Since the Parc y Scarlets stadium was opened in 2008, the words "Yma o Hyd" has been displayed above the players tunnel.

In more recent years has been sung by supporters of Wrexham A.F.C and Cardiff City FC and has also became an unofficial anthem for the Wales national football team. The players requested that Dafydd Iwan perform the song live before kick off of the penultimate game of the FIFA World Cup qualifying campaign against Austria, winning 2–1. The song was also sung live by Iwan in the final match of the campaign that saw Wales qualify for the FIFA World Cup for the first time since 1958 after defeating Ukraine 1–0. Gareth Bale, the Welsh captain, also led the Welsh team in singing along with Iwan after the final whistle. Wales national football team coach, Rob Page, said about the song, "Yma o Hyd, that's a massive anthem for us now. Chris Gunter started it. We played it every day before training and on the coach, and that's something we've got now as our anthem. It's a big part of what we're all about." The song reached No.1 in the iTunes charts once again in June 2022 following a campaign by Welsh football supporters.

A new version of the song was used for the official soundtrack and music video for Wales at the 2022 FIFA World Cup, featuring voices of y Wal Goch (Red Wall) of Wales fans. Dafydd Iwan said of the new remix, “It’s an impossible dream come true and the incredible sound of The Red Wall on this track is exciting and inspiring to hear ...No other nation will have anything like this to inspire their team on the grandest stage of them all.” The official video includes highlights and low points of Welsh football history and significant cultural moments. Some moments featured include the miners' strike, Iwan being released from prison following his arrest for vandalising road signs as part of a campaign for the Welsh language and Michael Sheen's speech to the Wales squad. 

In 2022, a poll found that 35% of the people of Wales knew some of the words to Yma o Hyd.

Use in media 

 A chapter on the history of the song and its context appears in Siôn Jobbins's book The Phenomenon of Welshness, or 'How many aircraft carriers would an independent Wales need?' .
 A version of the song appears in the Welsh black comedy film The Toll, released in the UK in 2021.
 The song was sampled in a bilingual rap song as part of Wales' FIFA World Cup campaign by rap artist Sage Todz, titled "O HYD".

See also 

 Dic Siôn Dafydd

References 

Welsh patriotic songs
Welsh folk songs
Welsh traditions
1981 songs
Wales national football team